The Institute of Science and Technology Austria (ISTA) is an international research institute in natural and mathematical sciences, located in Maria Gugging, Klosterneuburg, 20 km northwest of the Austrian capital of Vienna. It was established and inaugurated by the provincial government of Lower Austria and the federal government of Austria in 2009.

ISTA was established on the model of the Israeli Weizmann Institute of Science by its former president Israeli physicist Haim Harari. Like in the Weizmann Institute, scientists are encouraged to pursue their own goals and ideas not restricted by government or economic interest and all research themes are interdisciplinary.

The institute as of 2021 consists of 67 research groups. It is expected to grow to about ninety research groups by 2026, and 150 groups by 2036 following commitments from the federal state and Lower Austria. Its graduate school offers an interdisciplinary doctoral program in the life, formal and physical sciences. As of December 2020, 250 students were enrolled.

History 

The idea of creating a scientific flagship organization for research and postgraduate studies at the highest level was proposed by Austrian physicist Anton Zeilinger in 2002 at the annual technology forum in Alpbach. After several studies about the feasibility of creating such an institute, a working group was formed in the Austrian federal ministry of education and science and the four provinces of Lower Austria, Upper Austria, Styria and Vienna put in bids to host the new institute. In 2005, the council of ministers decided to build the institute in Klosterneuburg, Lower Austria.

In 2006, an international group of three scientists including Haim Harari, Olaf Kuebler and Hubert Markl were invited by the Federation of Austrian Industries to advise the establishment of the institute and create a road map for it. They published a report in June 2006 that became the foundation of ISTA.

The federal law on the Institute of Science and Technology Austria was passed in May 2006 and an agreement between the government of Lower Austria and the Federal government of Austria was reached in July.

Positions for the first president, professors and tenure track professors were advertised in 2007. Nick Barton was the first faculty to join. On December 4, 2008, computer scientist Thomas Henzinger was appointed as the first president of ISTA effective September 1, 2009. In November 2016, he was reappointed as the president of ISTA for a third 4-year term.

The institute had its opening ceremony in 2009, recruited its first cohort of students in 2010 and by the end of that year reached more than 100 employees from 22 countries.

In 2022, the abbreviation of the institute's name was changed from "IST Austria" to "ISTA".

First Evaluation 
According to the law, the institute is required to undergo an international and independent evaluation every four years. In January 2011, the Scientific Board organized the first independent evaluation of the new institute. The review panel consisted of six scientists who also had considerable experience in science management. The reviewers included two Nobel laureates and former or current presidents of distinguished research institutions. The panel broadly represented the natural and engineering sciences beyond the research areas that were present at ISTA at the time.

In March 2011, the evaluation committee came to the result that ISTA is on its way to becoming a leading research institution with an international reputation and that the institute is about to set new benchmarks for both research and training that will not only be important on the national level but also within Europe generally and even more widely. The committee pointed out that the trajectory of development of all the elements of ISTA is towards making an organization of clear excellence that will be recognized throughout the world, but continued governmental support is a necessary condition.

Second Evaluation 
In 2015, a second evaluation was carried out by an international review panel chaired by the Nobel laureate Roger Kornberg. The panel consisted of six distinguished scientists including three Nobel laureates and a Turing awardee. The report was very positive, reading "The next years will prove crucial if the ISTA is to achieve the goal of international distinction. The ISTA has made an excellent start, accomplishing the difficult task of starting from scratch and laying a foundation for future development, but the next step, rising to the top, will be even more difficult."

Reputation 
ISTA is ranked #1112 by the Center of World University Rankings (CWUR), #2166 by uniRank, and #3074 by EduRank. When normalized by size, its research output was ranked #3 in the world by the Nature Index in 2019. In 2022, Nature Index ranked ISTA #498.

Funding 
The long-term financial health of ISTA relies on four different sources of funding: public funding, national and international research grants, technology licensing, and donations. From 2017 to 2026, ISTA will receive up to €1.4 billion in public funding. Of those €1.4 billion, up to €990 million come from the federal government of Austria depending on the institute's ability to procure third-party funds. The state of Lower Austria provides the remaining €368 million in funding.

Organization 

The governance and management structures of ISTA guarantee the freedom from political and commercial influences. ISTA is headed by the President, who is appointed by the board of trustees. More than half of the board of trustees is made up of international scientists, the remainder comprises members appointed by the federal government and the government of Lower Austria. The President is further advised by the Scientific Board.

The first and recently reappointed President is Thomas A. Henzinger, a computer scientist and former professor of the University of California at Berkeley and the EPFL in Lausanne, Switzerland. He is supported by Vice President Michael Sixt, who oversees the operation of the scientific service units. The administration of ISTA is led by Managing Director Georg Schneider.

Graduate school
The institute's graduate school offers an interdisciplinary PhD program with six research tracks: biology, computer science, mathematics, neuroscience, physics, and data science and scientific computing. During the first year, students conduct three rotation projects in different research groups, before affiliating permanently with a research group and taking a qualifying exam. In the subsequent three to four years, students pursue research projects towards a PhD thesis.

Notable faculty
As of October 2021, the faculty consists of 67 professors and assistant professors,  including:

 Nick Barton, Evolutionary and Mathematical Biology
 Krishnendu Chatterjee, Theoretical Computer Science
 Jozsef Csicsvari, Systems Neuroscience
 Herbert Edelsbrunner, Algorithms, Geometry and Topology
 Tamás Hausel, Geometry, Pure Mathematics
 Thomas Henzinger, Software Systems Theory
 Robert Seiringer, Quantum Statistical Mechanics, Mathematical Physics
 Gašper Tkačik, Biophysics and Neuroscience

As of 2020, 50 ERC grants by the (European Research Council) have been awarded to IST faculty.

References

External links 
 
 ISTA: expansion "pretty much on schedule" (in German)

Universities and colleges in Austria
Educational institutions established in 2007
Scientific organisations based in Austria
Research institutes in Austria
2007 establishments in Austria